Kansas's 36th Senate district is one of 40 districts in the Kansas Senate. It has been represented by Republican Elaine Bowers since 2013. It is the most Republican-leaning Senate district in the state.

Geography
District 36 spans the rural northern edge of the state, covering all of Cloud, Jewell, Lincoln, Mitchell, Osborne, Ottawa, Republic, Rooks, Russell, Smith, and Washington Counties as well as parts of Marshall and Phillips Counties. Communities in the district include Concordia, Russell, Beloit, Marysville, Minneapolis, Phillipsburg, Belleville, Plainville, Smith Center, Osborne, Lincoln Center, Washington, and Stockton.

The district is located almost entirely within Kansas's 1st congressional district, with a small portion extending into the 2nd district. It overlaps with the 106th, 107th, 109th, and 110th districts of the Kansas House of Representatives. It borders the state of Nebraska.

Recent election results

2020

2016

2012

Federal and statewide results in District 36

References

36
Cloud County, Kansas
Jewell County, Kansas
Lincoln County, Kansas
Marshall County, Kansas
Mitchell County, Kansas
Osborne County, Kansas
Ottawa County, Kansas
Phillips County, Kansas
Republic County, Kansas
Rooks County, Kansas
Russell County, Kansas
Smith County, Kansas
Washington County, Kansas